Dušan Galis (born 24 November 1949) is a Slovak politician and a former football player and manager. In the Czechoslovak league he played 226 matches, scoring 89 goals. He was capped eight times for Czechoslovakia national team, scoring one goal. He was a participant at the 1976 European Football Championship where he became European Champion with his national team

Playing career 
Galis played for the youth team of Dolný Kubín. At age 20 he played for a 3rd Division team. His team was promoted in 1971 to Czechoslovak 2nd Division. Galis went, in 1972, to VSS Košice which was playing in the First League of Czechoslovakia and became top scorer in the season 1975–76 with 21 goals.

In that season, he was called to the Czechoslovakia national football team. In the third of his eight national team games, he scored the only goal that he scored with them. He headed the winning goal in Czechoslovakia's 2–1 victory against England for the 1976 UEFA European Football Championship qualifying and helped his team to qualify to the 1976 European Football Championship where he participated and Czechoslovakia became Champions of Europe.

Galis was transferred to Slovan Bratislava in 1977 where he remained until 1981. Then he went to Spain and played for Cádiz CF, but he went back to his country a year later and joined Žilina. In 1982–83 he played for club KSC Hasselt, and returned to Czechoslovakia for a year to play for ZŤS Petržalka before retiring.

Coaching career
Galis began his coaching career in 1990 as a trainer for Slovan Bratislava as a successor of Jozef Jankech, remaining until 1997. In 1992 his team broke the Sparta Prague dominance in Czechoslovak football and won the Czechoslovak Championship. Also in the Slovak League, Slovan won the championship in 1994, 1995 and 1996. In 1994 and 1997 the team won the Slovak Cup.

Galis became coach of Spartak Trnava in 1997, winning the Slovak Cup his first season. At the beginning of 1999, he became coach of Slovakia national team, without however coaching them in a game. He resigned after František Laurinec was elected president of Slovak Football Association. In the summer of 1999, he became coach of the Cypriot team Omonia Nicosia, however in October 1999, he resigned after the team's poor performance.

He managed Artmedia from 2000 until 2002. On 23 November 2003, he became coach of the Slovakia national team. Under his management, Slovakia placed second in the group for qualifications of World Cup 2006, eliminating Russia, but did not qualify to the FIFA World Cup for first time after their elimination in the play-offs by Spain with 5–1 and 1–1. After mutual agreement with the head of Slovak Football Association, František Laurinec, he resigned his position on 12 October 2006.

Career in politics 
Since 2006, Galis has been a Member of National Council of the Slovak Republic with the governing-coalition SMER-Social Democracy, a member of the Bratislava Regional VUC government and Government Commissioner for Youth and Sport.

Honours

Player
VSS Košice
 Slovak Cup: 1973

Czechoslovakia
 UEFA Euro: 1976

Manager
Slovan Bratislava
 Czechoslovak First League: 1991–92
 Slovak Super Liga: 1993–94, 1994–95, 1995–96
 Slovak Cup: 1993–94
 Slovak Super Cup: 1994

Spartak Trnava
 Slovak Cup: 1997–98
 Slovak Super Cup: 1998

Slovakia
 2006 FIFA World Cup qualification: Play-off

References

1949 births
Living people
Sportspeople from Ružomberok
Direction – Social Democracy politicians
FC Petržalka players
FC VSS Košice players
ŠK Slovan Bratislava managers
Cádiz CF players
Czechoslovak footballers
Czechoslovak football managers
AC Omonia managers
Expatriate football managers in Cyprus
Slovak footballers
Slovak football managers
FC Spartak Trnava managers
ŠK Slovan Bratislava players
UEFA Euro 1976 players
UEFA European Championship-winning players
La Liga players
Slovakia national football team managers
Czechoslovakia international footballers
FC Petržalka managers
Expatriate footballers in Spain
Czechoslovak expatriate sportspeople in Spain
Expatriate footballers in Belgium
Czechoslovak expatriate sportspeople in Belgium
Association football forwards
Members of the National Council (Slovakia) 2006-2010
Members of the National Council (Slovakia) 2010-2012
Members of the National Council (Slovakia) 2012-2016
Members of the National Council (Slovakia) 2016-2020
Members of the National Council (Slovakia) 2020-present